The canton of Ribemont is an administrative division in northern France. At the French canton reorganisation which came into effect in March 2015, the canton was expanded from 15 to 52 communes:
 
Alaincourt
Annois
Artemps
Aubigny-aux-Kaisnes
Benay
Berthenicourt
Bray-Saint-Christophe
Brissay-Choigny
Brissy-Hamégicourt
Cerizy
Châtillon-sur-Oise
Chevresis-Monceau
Clastres
Cugny
Dallon
Dury
Essigny-le-Grand
La Ferté-Chevresis
Flavy-le-Martel
Fontaine-lès-Clercs
Gibercourt
Happencourt
Hinacourt
Itancourt
Jussy
Ly-Fontaine
Mézières-sur-Oise
Mont-d'Origny
Montescourt-Lizerolles
Moÿ-de-l'Aisne
Neuvillette
Ollezy
Origny-Sainte-Benoite
Parpeville
Pithon
Pleine-Selve
Regny
Remigny
Renansart
Ribemont
Saint-Simon
Seraucourt-le-Grand
Séry-lès-Mézières
Sissy
Sommette-Eaucourt
Surfontaine
Thenelles
Tugny-et-Pont
Urvillers
Vendeuil
Villers-le-Sec  
Villers-Saint-Christophe

Demographics

See also
Cantons of the Aisne department 
Communes of France

References

Cantons of Aisne